Solovetsky (masculine), Solovetskaya (feminine), Solovetskoye (neuter), or Solovetskiye (plural) may refer to:
Solovetsky Islands, an island archipelago in the White Sea, Russia
Solovetsky District, the administrative division which this archipelago is incorporated as
Solovetsky Monastery, a museum located there
Solovetsky (rural locality) (Solovetskaya, Solovetskoye), name of several rural localities in Russia